is a video game for the PlayStation Portable, developed by Now Production, based on a medieval setting where the player is basically a zombie-creating overlord. There is an option to play as three characters, all who were brutally murdered by the order of the king and want revenge on him.

Gameplay

Plot
The story follows a trio of knights: Romulus Blood (Keith Ferguson), a human knight and former head of the House of Blood who made a Faustian bargain with an unseen demon known as The Beast (Steve Blum), along with his younger brother Remus (Andrew Kashino) and Remus' wife and princess of Cavalier named Sylvia Gradis (Megan Hollingshead) while they are at the end of their lives after the entire House of Blood is slaughtered under the orders of the king Kirk Gladys (Also voiced by Steve Blum) and his charismatic, tyrannical wife Fatima (Wendy Braun). Over the course of the game, The Beast grants each of the three characters a second chance at life as necromancers with the ability to turn their still living enemies into undead soldiers.

The trio first go after Duke Gloucester, a former war hero who became a corrupt glutton and fight against him. Gollaster attempted to send a demon out to kill them in a desperate attempt, but he was soon killed by the knights. The trio soon discover that as a result of the bargain with the Beast, they have started to become more demonic as they go on their path of revenge.

As the story progresses, each one of the three knights goes after several individuals responsible for taking part in their deaths and soon discover a fruit known as the Fruit of the Holy Tree, a demonic fruit that turns its user into a demon. Captain Gerrard, a leader of a trio of knights who praise Fatima as a saint, uses the Fruit of the Holy Tree after finding out his daughter was killed in a battle with the Undead Knights and becomes a giant demon known as the Nephilim. In his dying words, Gerard reveals that Fatima also controls a portion of undead servants of her own, having long since forsaken the land of Cavalier for her own selfish goals.

Later, the undead knights encounter various genetically engineered soldiers called Ouroboros created by the mad, egocentric wizard Lord Follis (Liam O'Brien), who attempted to convince the knights to join them, only to be told off. A battle ensues in which Follis uses the Fruit of the Holy Tree to mutate into a demon known as Venom Angel and is killed by the knights.

After the battle, Fatima's younger brother the Jester (Thomas Brownhead) reveals that Romulus was the one who was inadvertently responsible for the deaths of Sylvia and Remus. During the attack on the House of Blood, Romulus was one of the knights participating in the attack and was searching for the two of them in the midst of the chaos. When Kirk's knights captured them, Romulus summoned up all of his rage induced bloodlust and slaughtered everyone in his path, but accidentally killed Sylvia and Remus during his rampage. Having earned the forgiveness of Sylvia and Remus, the three knights go to finally confront The Jester, who reveals himself to be a product of Fatima's experiments with the occult. Another battle ensues and the knights succeed in killing the jester. They soon find a trio of knights whom they had killed earlier also revived into undead, defeating them in the process and ultimately kill Kirk Gradis, who had lost everything and became horrified by the uncontrollable powers Fatima had given him, but regretted ever betraying the House of Blood.

In the finale, the truth of Fatima's rise to power and the dark powers she gave to her subordinates is finally revealed: Fatima herself was once a human who made a pact with The Beast in a demonic realm called The Void (eventually learning to control the blood's power to the point where she retained her current human appearance and intellect) and that the demonic power The Beast gave them was not really magic as Lord Follis had said, but it was an infection created from the Beast's blood. Fatima also reveals that she created the Holy Tree from the Beast's blood in order to get rid of humanity's fear of death and creating her own ideal world where humans are immortal and will no longer bear the burden of life. When the knights oppose her goal of creating a world of undead demons, Fatima fuses herself with the tree and becomes a demon called Yggdrasil, only to be killed by the knights.

In her last breath, Fatima offers a crystallized stone made of demon blood to protect the knights from The Beast's influence, fearing that they will be hunted for what they have done in the name of vengeance. The trio soon realizes that The Beast had been using them as assassins right from the start while The Beast tells them that they are beyond redemption after all they have done. This leads them to destroy the crystal Fatima had given them in an act of defiance towards The Beast's wish of keeping them as slaves. Furious with their rebuke, The Beast warns the knights that they will die again and that they will go to hell after their deaths with the Beast saying he will "keep a spot nice and warm for (them)." In the game's epilogue, the trio admits that they will serve the punishment for their sins in vengeance as "undead knights".

Release

On October 1, 2009, the Undead Knights demo was mistakenly replaced with the full game on the PlayStation Store, giving consumers an opportunity to download the full game for free.

Reception
The reception was very mixed: the reviewers expressed extreme opinions with regards to the most controversial elements of the game. Some of them scorned the inconsistencies with the decorum of the genre and condemned the mixture of the underground death/black metal soundtrack and explicitly vulgar language not necessarily suited to the dark fantasy/medieval entourage. The others in turn praised the game and its story for the potency to evoke cathartic experiences.

Trivia 
The narrative layer of the game is abundant in references to the Jewish and Christian creation accounts present in the Bible, early Rabbinic literature and apocrypha and pseudepigrapha. The game utilizes such motifs as the fall of angels, the tree of knowledge of good and evil and the secret of immortality.

References

External links

Undead Knights @ IGN

2009 video games
Action-adventure games
Now Production games
Koei Tecmo games
PlayStation Portable games
PlayStation Portable-only games
Video games developed in Japan
Video games about zombies
Multiplayer and single-player video games